La Vie en Rose (literally Life in pink,) is a 2007 biographical musical film about the life of French singer Édith Piaf. The film was co-written and directed by Olivier Dahan, and stars Marion Cotillard as Piaf. The UK and US title La Vie en Rose comes from Piaf's signature song. The film is an international co-production between France, Czech Republic, and the United Kingdom. It made its world premiere at the 2007 Berlin Film Festival in the main competition.

Cotillard's performance received critical acclaim and earned her several awards including the Academy Award for Best Actress – the first time an Oscar had been given for a French-language role – the BAFTA Award for Best Actress in a Leading Role, the Golden Globe Award for Best Actress – Motion Picture Musical or Comedy and the César Award for Best Actress. The film also won the Academy Award for Best Makeup and Hairstyling, the BAFTA Award for Best Makeup, BAFTA Award for Best Costume Design, BAFTA Award for Best Film Music, and four additional César Awards. The film grossed $87.4 million worldwide.

Plot
The film is structured as a largely non-linear series of key events from the life of Édith Piaf.  The film begins with elements from her childhood, and at the end with the events prior to and surrounding her death, poignantly juxtaposed by a performance of her song, "Non, je ne regrette rien" (No, I do not Regret Anything).

Beginning in 1918, young Édith suffers a chaotic childhood and is eventually sent to live with her paternal-grandmother, who runs a brothel in Normandy. Édith witnesses the brutal business of prostitution. When she suffers an episode of keratitis-induced blindness, a kind sex worker named Titine tenderly cares for Édith.

Édith's World War I veteran father collects her to accompany him while he works as a circus acrobat. One night, Édith sees a vision of St Thérèse in a fire eater's flames. St Thérèse says she will always be with Édith—a belief that she carries for the rest of her life. When Édith is nine years old, her father leaves the circus and performs on the streets of Paris. During a lackluster performance, a passerby asks if Édith is part of the show. She spontaneously sings "La Marseillaise" with raw emotion, mesmerizing the street crowd.

Years later, nightclub owner Louis Leplée hires Édith to sing at his club and gives her the stage surname of Piaf, a colloquialism for sparrow that is inspired by her diminutive height of only 1.47m (4 ft 8in). However, Leplée is soon shot dead and the police suspect it's due to Édith's connections to the mafia. When she next attempts a show at a cabaret, she is jeered off the stage by a hostile crowd. Things go from bad to worse when her best friend, Mômone, is forcibly taken to a convent. Desperate, Édith turns to Raymond Asso, a songwriter and accompanist. Through harsh means, he enlivens her stage presence with hand gestures, better enunciation, and other lessons.

Édith's career progresses and she achieves fame. While performing in New York City, Édith meets Marcel Cerdan, a fellow French national and a middleweight boxer competing for the World Champion title. Despite him being married, Édith believes she's falling in love with Marcel. An affair ensues and, while it's supposedly a secret, "La Vie En Rose" is played for Marcel wherever he goes. Édith persuades Marcel to fly from Paris to join her in New York, and he wakes her up in her bedroom with a kiss. She goes to get coffee and is informed by her entourage that Marcel was killed when his plane crashed. Édith hysterically searches for the his ghost.

The narrative bookends scenes from Édith's middle life with repeated vignettes. One set of memories shows Édith with short curly hair, singing on stage and collapsing. She develops arthritis, as well as a severe morphine addiction. Her husband, Jacques Pills, persuades her to enter drug rehabilitation, and she travels to California with him. A now-sober but manic Édith drives around in a convertible while joking and teasing her compatriots. She drives into a Joshua tree, but the hilarity continues as Édith gets out and pretends to hitchhike.

Years later, an aged Édith is now frail and hunched. She squabbles with her entourage about whether or not she will be able to perform at the Olympia. Charles Dumont and Michel Vaucaire offer her the composition, "Non, je ne regrette rien,” which she loves and announces that she will perform it.

Prior to what turns out to be her last performance, Édith asks for the cross necklace that she always wears and her staff rush away to get it. She sits in quiet solitude and experiences memories of her past. After Édith puts on the retrieved cross and shuffles out onto the stage, more flashbacks are shown as she sings. Édith relives a sunny day on a beach while knitting. She answers an interviewer’s questions, during which she repeatedly encourages others to "Love."

Édith's hard living and cancer has caused her to waste away at the age of 47. As she is tucked into bed, a subtitle reveals this is her last day alive. She is afraid and experiences a disjointed series of memories of small, yet defining moments—her mother commenting on her "wild eyes", her father giving her a doll, and thoughts of her own dead child, Marcelle. In a flashback, Édith performs "Non, je ne regrette rien" at the Olympia.

Cast

 Marion Cotillard as Édith Piaf
 Sylvie Testud as Simone "Mômone" Berteaut
 Pascal Greggory as Louis Barrier
 Emmanuelle Seigner as Titine
 Jean-Paul Rouve as Louis Alphonse Gassion
 Gérard Depardieu as Louis Leplée
 Clotilde Courau as Annetta Gassion
 Jean-Pierre Martins as Marcel Cerdan
 Catherine Allégret as Louise Gassion
 Marc Barbé as Raymond Asso
 Marie-Armelle Deguy as Marguerite Monnot
 Caroline Raynaud as Ginou
 Denis Ménochet as Journalist in Orly
 Pavlína Němcová as American journalist
 Harry Hadden-Paton as Doug Davis
 Caroline Sihol as Marlene Dietrich
 Pauline Burlet as a young Édith Piaf
 Farida Amrouche as Emma Saïd Ben Mohamed
 André Penvern : Jacques Canetti 
 Marie-Armelle Deguy : Marguerite Monnot

Production
Director Olivier Dahan had the idea for the film on 22 January 2004, when he was in a bookstore and had just found a book of photographs of Édith Piaf and began to look at them. "I didn't know about her very early years and (there was) a photo that really made this first impression for me. It was a photo of her in a street when she was something like 17 years old and she really looked 'punk' (in terms of her) clothes and everything (and her) attitude. This photo was so far from the iconic image that I had (of Piaf when she was older). I just started to imagine something very quickly — what was in between that very early photo and the iconic image of her in the black dress and everything. That's the first impression (I had)", Dahan said.

Marion Cotillard was chosen by Dahan to portray the French singer Édith Piaf in the biopic La Vie en Rose before he had even met her, saying that he noticed a similarity between Piaf's and Cotillard's eyes. Producer Alain Goldman and casting director Olivier Carbone accepted and defended the choice, even though distributor TF1 reduced the money they gave to finance the film thinking Cotillard wasn't "bankable" enough an actress. The producers originally wanted Audrey Tautou for the role, and reduced $5 million of the budget after Cotillard was cast. Tautou's agent, Laurent Grégoire, said he had set up a meeting between Tautou and the film's producers. When Tautou was informed of the film's premise, she responded: "Who is going to be interested in a film about Édith Piaf?", and the producers lost interest in casting her, so he suggested his other client, Marion Cotillard, for the role.

Filming took place in four months. 

Four songs were entirely performed by "Parigote" singer Jil Aigrot: "Mon Homme" (My Man), "Les Mômes de la Cloche" (The kids of the bell), "Mon Légionnaire" (My legionnaire), "Les Hiboux" (Owls) as well as the third verse and chorus of "L'Accordéoniste" (The accordionist) and the first chorus of "Padam, padam...". Only parts of these last two songs were sung because they were sung while Piaf/Cotillard was fatigued and collapsed on stage. Apart from that, "La Marseillaise" is performed by child singer Cassandre Berger (lip-synched by Pauline Burlet, who plays the young Édith in the film), and Mistinguett's "Mon Homme" (My Man) and "Il m'a vue nue" (He saw me naked) (sung in part by Emmanuelle Seigner) also appear. Recordings of Piaf are also used.

Release
La Vie en Rose was the opening film of the 57th Berlin International Film Festival, where it made its world premiere in the main competition on 8 February 2007. Cotillard's performance received an ovation from journalists at the festival's press conference. 

The film was released theatrically in France by TFM Distribution on 13 February 2007, in Czech Republic by Bioscop on 14 June 2007, in the United Kingdom by Icon Film Distribution on 22 June 2007. New Line Cinema/HBO joint venture Picturehouse acquired US distribution rights to the film after Picturehouse president, Bob Berney, and the company's head of acquisitions, Sara Rose, watched a 10-minute footage of it at the 2006 Cannes Film Festival, and later released the film in theaters on 8 June 2007.

Reception

Box office
In theaters, the film grossed US$87,484,847 worldwide – $10,301,706 in the United States and Canada and $77,183,141 elsewhere in the world. In Francophone countries including France, Algeria, Monaco, Morocco and Tunisia, the film grossed a total of $42,651,334.

The film became the third-highest-grossing French-language film in the United States since 1980 (behind Amélie and Brotherhood of the Wolf).

Critical response

The film received positive reviews from critics. On review aggregator website Rotten Tomatoes, the film received an approval rating of 74% based on 154 reviews, with an average rating of 6.89/10. The site's critical consensus reads, "The set design and cinematography are impressive, but the real achievement of La Vie en Rose is Marion Cotillard's mesmerizing, wholly convincing performance as Edith Piaf." On Metacritic, the film has a weighted average score of 66 out of 100 based on 29 critics, indicating "generally favorable reviews". Cotillard received widespread critical acclaim for her performance, with many critics citing it as the best performance of the year and one of the greatest acting performances of all time. A. O. Scott of The New York Times, while unimpressed with the film itself, said "it is hard not to admire Ms. Cotillard for the discipline and ferocity she brings to the role." Carino Chocano of the Los Angeles Times opined that "Marion Cotillard is astonishing as the troubled singer in a technically virtuosic and emotionally resonant performance..." Richard Nilsen from Arizona Republic was even more enthusiastic, writing "don't bother voting. Just give the Oscar to Marion Cotillard now. As the chanteuse Édith Piaf in La Vie en rose, her acting is the most astonishing I've seen in years."

Critic Mark Kermode of The Observer was less keen; while he felt there was much to applaud, there was also "plenty to regret". Kermode agreed that the source material provided "heady inspiration", and that Cotillard plays everything with "kamikaze-style intensity", but thought the film lacking in structure and narrative, creating "an oddly empty experience".

Accolades

Notes

References

External links
 
 
 
 
 

2007 films
French musical drama films
2000s musical drama films
Films directed by Olivier Dahan
Icon Productions films
Picturehouse films
2000s French-language films
2000s English-language films
2007 independent films
French-language Czech films
English-language Czech films
Czech multilingual films
Biographical films about singers
French nonlinear narrative films
Films set in the 1910s
Films set in the 1920s
Films set in the 1930s
Films set in the 1940s
Films set in the 1950s
Films set in the 1960s
Films shot in France
Films set in France
Films set in Paris
Films set in Manhattan
Films shot in the Czech Republic
Films that won the Academy Award for Best Makeup
Films featuring a Best Actress Academy Award-winning performance
Films featuring a Best Actress César Award-winning performance
Films featuring a Best Actress Lumières Award-winning performance
Films featuring a Best Musical or Comedy Actress Golden Globe winning performance
Czech Lion Awards winners (films)
Cultural depictions of Édith Piaf
Cultural depictions of Marlène Dietrich
BAFTA winners (films)
2007 drama films
2000s French films